Rogers & Cowan is a global marketing and public relations agency.   A division of the  Interpublic Group of Companies (NYSE: IPG), the company is based in Los Angeles, with offices in New York, Miami, and London.

History 
Rogers & Cowan was founded in 1950 in Los Angeles, California, by Henry C. Rogers and Warren Cowan.  Actors and actresses were then promoted almost exclusively by the film studios to whom they were under contract, and Rogers and Cowan began instead to promote them independent of the studio system.

In 1987, Rogers & Cowan was acquired by the London-based Shandwick P.L.C., the largest public relations consultancy in the UK. Shandwick PLC was in turn purchased by New York-based Interpublic Group of Companies in 1998.    Tom Tardio was Rogers and Cowan's chairman and CEO since 1991. in 2016, Mark Owens joined as CEO.  Paul Bloch, one of the firm's original partners, is the company's co-chairman.

In the early 1990s, Rogers & Cowan expanded into publicity for independent and studio film releases, film festivals, cable and network television programming, album launches, concert tours, fashion designers and collections, and awards show campaigns and high-profile entertainment events. In addition, Tardio led Rogers & Cowan into digital and streaming entertainment, enhanced television, and consumer electronic devices.  Since 2004,  Rogers & Cowan has acquired talent and resources from the fields of international film (Denmead Marketing, 2004) fashion (Film Fashion, 2005), arts and culture (Hinckley & Co., 2006), television and lifestyle marketing (Spotlight Communications, 2008), and faith and family marketing (L.A.B. Media, 2008).  Additionally, in 2009, Tardio launched AllWays Integrated Marketing, a separate PR brand focused on meshing key PR disciplines.

In 2013, Rogers & Cowan acquired Shannon Barr Public Relations and Zucker Public Relations. In March 2015, Tom Tardio was appointed Chairman of the Board of Socialtext, an enterprise social software provider, after serving as Rogers & Cowan chief executive officer for more than 25 years.

Mark Owens was named chief executive officer in November 2015. He previously served as the company's chief revenue officer.

On July 30, 2019, Rogers & Cowan announced that it had merged with sister IPG publicity firm PMK BNC. A new name for the combined firm will be unveiled in the coming months.

Campaigns

Rogers & Cowan's campaigns include the relaunch of MySpace, a consumer awareness campaign for The Cooking Channel, a multi-platform campaign for Sprite Films, and Target's live performance media buy with the Imagine Dragons for the 2015 GRAMMY Awards.

The company also does product placement into films, television programs, music videos and webisodes, including the integration of American Airlines into Paramount Pictures'  Up in the Air.

Awards
Rogers & Cowan has won several awards,  including a 2013 CSR Award (EKOCYCLE Coca-Cola) campaign; a PRSA Silver Anvil Award of Excellence (USA Pro Cycling Challenge); an Adweek Buzz Award Microsoft Windows Live; and a PRism Award. Additionally,  Rogers & Cowan was named Agency of the Year by the Bulldog Reporter in 2012 and 2013.

References

External links 
 Rogers & Cowan
 Interpublic Group of Companies (IPG)

Business services companies established in 1950
Companies based in Los Angeles
Public relations companies of the United States
1950 establishments in California